Tungsten fluoride may refer to:

 Tungsten(IV) fluoride (tungsten tetrafluoride)
 Tungsten hexafluoride (tungsten(VI) fluoride)